Broughtonia may refer to:
 Broughtonia (bush cricket), a genus of insects in the tribe Platycleidini
 Broughtonia (plant), a genus of orchids